CentrumDemokraternes Ungdom (Youth of the Centre Democrats), is a former Danish political organization.  It was founded in 1982 and was the youth wing of the Centrum-Demokraterne (Centre Democrats). 

Chairpeople were:

 1982-1984 Stig Nielsen
 1984-1986 Lars-Peter Pedersen
 1986-1988 Leif Hein Jørgensen
 1988-1992 Jesper Brønnum
 1992-1993 Sune Borgen Uldall
 1993-1994 Steen Lund Olsen
 1994-1996 Hans Olav Nymand
 1996-1997 Carlos Villaro Lassen
 1997-1999 Jacob de Tusch-Lec
 1999-2001 Regitze Rugholm
 2001-2003 Troels Krarup Frandsen
 2003-2004 Lars Richard Rasmussen
 2004-2006 Anne Sigrid Piil Svane

Youth wings of political parties in Denmark